Amar Kvakić (born 30 October 2002) is a professional footballer who plays as a centre-back for Bosnian club Velež Mostar.

Kvakić started his professional career at Kapfenberger SV, before joining Metalist 1925 Kharkiv in 2021. Born in Austria, he has represented Bosnia and Herzegovina at various youth levels.

Club career

Early career
Kvakić started playing football at a local club, before joining youth setup of his hometown club GAK in 2011. In 2017, he moved to youth academy of Kapfenberger SV. He made his professional debut against Horn on 29 May 2019 at the age of 16. On 26 October 2020, he scored his first professional goal against Austria Klagenfurt.

In July 2021, Kvakić switched to Ukrainian club Metalist 1925 Kharkiv. On 31 January 2022, he was loaned to Floridsdorfer AC in Austria.

International career
Kvakić represented Bosnia and Herzegovina at various youth levels.

Career statistics

Club

References

External links
 
 

2002 births
Living people
Footballers from Graz
Austrian people of Bosnia and Herzegovina descent
Austrian footballers
Bosnia and Herzegovina footballers
Bosnia and Herzegovina youth international footballers
Association football central defenders
Kapfenberger SV players
FC Metalist 1925 Kharkiv players
Floridsdorfer AC players
FK Velež Mostar players
2. Liga (Austria) players
Ukrainian Premier League players
Bosnia and Herzegovina expatriate footballers
Austrian expatriate footballers
Austrian expatriate sportspeople in Ukraine
Expatriate footballers in Ukraine
Bosnia and Herzegovina expatriate sportspeople in Ukraine